Mont Blanc is a ski resort in the Laurentian Mountains and south of Mont-Tremblant, in Les Laurentides Regional County Municipality (MRC), in administrative region of Laurentides (region), in Quebec, Canada. It is located in the municipality of Mont-Blanc, just east of Mont Tremblant.

The resort is owned by American lawyer Phillip Robinson since 1976. It is run by his two sons, William and Michael Robinson.

Main recreational activities
The ski resort offers 208 vertical metres. This ski center is equipped with seven ski lifts. It has 43 trails as well as two snow parks and 2 learning areas. It offers a wide variety of trails suitable for all levels of skiers and snowboarders. More than 130 certified instructors train new skiers (of all ages) who are learning a sliding sport (skiing, snowboarding) on gentle slopes, easy lifts and safe terrain.

References 

Summits of Laurentides
Blanc
Tourist attractions in Laurentides